A by-election was held for the New South Wales Legislative Assembly electorate of Wellington on 26 July 1860 because Nicolas Hyeronimus died.

Dates

Polling places

Result

Nicolas Hyeronimus died.

See also
Electoral results for the district of Wellington
List of New South Wales state by-elections

Notes

References

1860 elections in Australia
New South Wales state by-elections
1860s in New South Wales